Sturamustine, also known as dehydroepiandrosterone (DHEA) 17β-N-(2-chloroethyl)-N-nitrosourea, is a synthetic androstane steroid and a C17β nitrosourea conjugate of dehydroepiandrosterone (DHEA) which was developed as a cytostatic antineoplastic agent (i.e., a chemotherapy drug) for the treatment of hormone-dependent tumors but was never marketed. It was synthesized in 1982.

See also
 List of hormonal cytostatic antineoplastic agents
 List of androgen esters

References

Abandoned drugs
Androgens and anabolic steroids
Androstanes
Antineoplastic drugs
Experimental cancer drugs
Nitrosoureas
Organochlorides
Prodrugs
Steroid esters
Chloroethyl compounds